August Blanche (17 September 1811 – 30 November 1868) was a Swedish journalist, novelist, and politician.

Life
August Theodor Blanche was born in Stockholm, Sweden, the illegitimate child of a servant girl and a priest. His mother eventually married Johan Jacob Blanck, a blacksmith and the boy took his stepfather's name. A brilliant student, in 1838 he obtained a law degree and for a time, worked as a civil servant until taking up journalism. In the early 1840s, he began writing plays for the theater as well as translating plays from foreign languages into Swedish. By the middle of the decade, he was writing novels and short stories of intrigue, all of which met with a great deal of success.

An activist, in 1859 Blanche was elected to the Swedish Parliament where he served until 1866. He died of unknown causes two years later, on 30 November 1868, on the way to participate in the unveiling of the statue of King Charles the XII, which he had lobbied for.

August Blanche is interred in the Norra begravningsplatsen in Stockholm.

See also
Stockholms Figaro

External links
 
 
 

1811 births
1868 deaths
Swedish male writers
Swedish-language writers
Members of the Riksdag
19th-century Swedish journalists
Male journalists
Swedish male dramatists and playwrights
19th-century Swedish dramatists and playwrights
Burials at Norra begravningsplatsen
19th-century male writers